The Association of Southeast Asian Institutions of Higher Learning (ASAIHL) is a non-governmental organization (NGO). Its aim is to assist member institutions to strengthen themselves through mutual self-help to achieve distinction in teaching, research, and public service, thereby contributing to their respective nations and beyond.
Established in Bangkok in January 1955, it is one of the oldest regional organizations in Southeast Asia.
 the ASAIHL Secretary-General is Dr Ninnat  Olanvoravuth of Chulalongkorn University.

Members
As of 2020, ASAIHL has 246 member institutions from 25 countries.

Founders
 Sir Nicholas Attygalle, University of Ceylon
 Air Marshal Muni M. Vejyant Rangshrisht, Chulalongkorn University
 Dr Lindsay Ride, University of Hong Kong
 Prof Bahder Djohan, University of Indonesia
 Sir Sydney Caine, University of Malaya
 Dr Vidal A. Tan, University of the Philippines Diliman
 Dr Htin Aung, University of Rangoon
 Prof Nguyễn Quang Trình, National University of Vietnam

References

External links
ASAIHL website

College and university associations and consortia in Asia
International college and university associations and consortia
Education in Southeast Asia